Ready at Dawn Studios LLC (RAD) is an American video game developer located in Irvine, California, and is composed of former members of Naughty Dog and Blizzard Entertainment. Formed in 2003, the company has primarily worked on games for the PlayStation Portable (PSP), most notably the Sony Computer Entertainment intellectual property God of War and Daxter. Ready at Dawn also now has a satellite campus in Portland, Oregon to assist with future PC and console game development. The studio is now part of Oculus Studios as of June 2020.

History
Ready at Dawn was founded in 2003 in Irvine, California, United States by Ru Weerasuriya,  Andrea Pessino, Didier Malenfant, and former members of the Sony Computer Entertainment subsidiary Naughty Dog. They released their first game, Daxter, in 2006. The company finished working on their second PSP game, God of War: Chains of Olympus as well as a Wii port of Ōkami, with added motion controls. In June 2008 it was confirmed that the company had ceased developing games for the PSP, and that they had returned the relevant development kits to Sony. However, reports claim that the developer received new development kits after returning. Their next game was God of War: Ghost of Sparta, collaboratively developed with Santa Monica Studio for the PSP, with their new proprietary engine. Ready at Dawn released the God of War: Origins Collection for the PlayStation 3 on September 13, 2011. This collection is a port of their two God of War games for the PSP, Chains of Olympus and Ghost of Sparta, to the PS3 with high-definition graphics, DualShock 3 support, Trophies, and Stereoscopic 3D, the first God of War release to support this feature.

In October 2009, Ready at Dawn began working on a new game engine. The Ready at Dawn Engine is said to be a wholly console-centric platform, integrated with a suite of third-party tools that require no additional license. These tools include 3D content editing, audio, user interface, and asset management systems. In July 2010, it was announced that Ready at Dawn had made thirteen employees redundant, citing difficulties in finding funding between projects behind the redundancies. In early 2012, the company began hiring for the development of a third-person action-adventure game for a "next generation home console game system." Ready at Dawn and Sony later revealed the game at E3 2013 as The Order: 1886. In June 2015, Ru Weerasuriya, the founder of the company, announced that his position as CEO will be replaced by Paul Sams and will step down to become the company's president and chief creative officer. Ready at Dawn was in attendance at the large Chinese game publisher, Tencent’s UP Conference in April 2017, this was to announce a partnership to bring Ready at Dawn games into China. This partnership was headlined by bringing the game Deformers to China, although it was short lived due to the Deformers servers being shut down August 2018.

In July 2017, Ready at Dawn released Lone Echo and Echo Arena exclusively for the Oculus Rift. Echo Arena has since been included in the VR League, a VR esports segment of ESL, since Season 1. In November 2018, Ready at Dawn released Echo Combat, a first-person shooter DLC using the same zero-g movement found in Echo Arena, and announced that the company had opened a satellite studio in Portland, Oregon. It is to be believed that this new satellite studio is a part of the development of Ready at Dawn’s new project that was teased back in February 2018.

In July 2018, it was announced by CTO Andrea Pessino that all future development at the company would be done using the Rust programming language. This made Ready at Dawn one of the first game studios to adopt the language, as game development is primarily done using C or C++.

Oculus Studios, under Meta Platforms, acquired Ready at Dawn in June 2020 to develop VR titles for the platform.

On January 31, 2023, Ready at Dawn announced they would be shutting down Echo Arena on August 1, 2023, to focus on future projects.

Games developed

References

Wawro, A. (n.d.). Ready at Dawn joins list of devs working with Tencent to launch games into China. Retrieved from http://www.gamasutra.com/view/news/296511/Ready_At_Dawn_joins_list_of_devs_working_with_Tencent_to_launch_games_into_China.php

Kidwell, E. (n.d.). Ready at Dawn shuts down Deformers servers. Retrieved from https://www.gamasutra.com/view/news/324451/Ready_at_Dawn_shuts_down_Deformers_servers.php

External links

2003 establishments in California
Companies based in Irvine, California
American companies established in 2003
Video game companies established in 2003
Oculus VR
Video game companies of the United States
Video game development companies
2020 mergers and acquisitions
Meta Platforms acquisitions